Annu Shukla is an Indian politician. She was a member of the Bihar Legislative Assembly from Lalganj as a member of Janata Dal (United). She is the wife of Vijay Kumar Shukla.

References 

Janata Dal (United) politicians
Bihar MLAs 2010–2015
Women members of the Bihar Legislative Assembly
21st-century Indian women politicians
21st-century Indian politicians
20th-century Indian women politicians
20th-century Indian politicians
Living people
Year of birth missing (living people)